George Heywood (12 January 1907 – 7 September 1985) was an English professional footballer who played in the Football League for Port Vale and Southport.

Early and personal life
George Heywood was born on 12 January 1907 in Clayton, Manchester. His father, Fred, played professional football for Newcastle United and Blackpool. He died of a heart attack on 7 September 1985, whilst on holiday in Guernsey.

Career

Early career
Heywood played for South Salford Lads from 1921 to 1927 and was capped by England Schoolboys against Wales in 1921. He was spotted by Billy Meredith and signed to Manchester City as an amateur. He played 11 Central League games at left-back for the Reserves, and also played for Oldham Athletic Reserves in the Midweek League.

Altrincham
Heywood joined Altrincham and played two Cheshire County League games at right-back during the 1928–29 campaign. He signed a contract with the club in April 1930, playing the last four games of the 1929–30 season at right-back. He missed just two games of the 1930–31 season, featuring in both full-back positions. He played 50 games from right-back of the 1931–32 campaign, but rejected interest from Football League clubs such as Crystal Palace and Burnley as he was satisfied with his job at the GEC as a mechanical inspector. He missed just three games in the 1932–33 season. He won the Cheshire Senior Cup with the club in 1934, as Altrincham beat Congleton Town 1–0 in the final at Edgeley Park. He also scored his first goal during the 1933–34 season, converting a penalty kick. Altrincham finished second to Wigan Athletic in the 1934–35 season and also reached the semi-finals in both the Cheshire Senior Cup and the Cheshire County Cup; he scored two goals in 55 appearances playing across from former England international left-back Billy Felton.

Later career
Heywood joined Port Vale for a £250 fee in November 1935. His debut came in a 9–2 defeat to Nottingham Forest at the City Ground. Despite the heavy loss he remained he a regular for the rest of the season, making 21 appearances as the "Valiants" were relegated out of the Second Division. He lost his place soon into the next season however and was transferred to Third Division North rivals Southport in November 1936. Southport were suffering an injury crisis and trainer Jimmy Seddon and known Heywood from his time at Altrincham. He spent the 1937–38 campaign with Hyde United, making 41 Cheshire County League appearances and also playing three cup games. He later played for Northwich Victoria and Stalybridge Celtic, before returning to Altrincham. He retired from football in 1940.

Style of play
Heywood was a full-back with pace and tackling ability, as well as passing technique and good positional sense.

Career statistics

Honours
Altrincham
Cheshire Senior Cup: 1934

References

People from Clayton
Footballers from Manchester
English footballers
England schools international footballers
Association football fullbacks
Manchester City F.C. players
Altrincham F.C. players
Port Vale F.C. players
Southport F.C. players
Hyde United F.C. players
Northwich Victoria F.C. players
Stalybridge Celtic F.C. players
English Football League players
1907 births
1985 deaths